Mallige Hoove is a 1992 Indian Kannada-language romantic action film directed and written by Raj Kishor  and produced by S. V. Rajendra Singh Babu. The film featured Ambareesh, Shashikumar and Rupini in the lead roles. The film's music was composed by Hamsalekha and dialogues written by Chi. Udaya Shankar. This film is a remake of 1988 Tamil film Senthoora Poove.

Cast 
 Ambareesh
 Rupini
 Shashikumar
 Priyanka
 Sangram Singh
 Vijayalalitha
 Ramakrishna
 Prakash Rai
 M. S. Umesh
 Tennis Krishna
 Dingri Nagaraj

Soundtrack 
The music of the film was composed and lyrics written by Hamsalekha.

References 

1992 films
1990s Kannada-language films
Indian romantic drama films
Indian romantic action films
Films scored by Hamsalekha
Kannada remakes of Tamil films
1990s romantic action films
1992 romantic drama films